The 2022 European 300 m Rifle Championships was the 12nd edition of the 300 m rifle competition, European 300 m Rifle Championships, organised by the International Shooting Sport Federation as a stand alone championships.

Results

Men

Women

Open

Mixed

Medal table

References

External links
 
 Result Book

European 300 m Rifle Championships
European 300 m Rifle Championships
European 300 m Rifle Championships
European 300 m Rifle Championships
2022 European 300 m Rifle Championships
2022 European 300 m Rifle Championships